Petra Schwille (born 25 January 1968 in Sindelfingen) is a German professor and a researcher in the area of biophysics.
Since 2011, she has been a director of the Department of Cellular and Molecular Biophysics at the Max Planck Institute for Biochemistry in Martinsried, Germany.
She is known for her ground-laying work in the field of fluorescence cross-correlation spectroscopy, and numerous contributions on model membranes. Her current research focuses around bottom-up approaches to building an artificial cell within a broader area of synthetic biology. In 2010, Schwille received the Gottfried Wilhelm Leibniz Prize.

Education 
Schwille graduated with a Diploma in physics from the University of Göttingen in 1993.
She worked toward her doctoral degree in physics at the Max Planck Institute for Biophysical Chemistry in Göttingen, Germany, and received her degree from Technical University of Braunschweig in 1996, with a thesis on fluorescence cross-correlation spectroscopy.

Career 
Schwille worked as a postdoctoral researcher at Cornell University in 1997, and returned to the Max Planck Institute for Biophysical Chemistry in Göttingen to a research group leader position in 1999.
She became a professor of biophysics at TU Dresden in 2002.
In 2012, Schwille became the director of the research department "Cellular and Molecular Biophysics" at the Max Planck Institute of Biochemistry in Martinsried, Germany, as well as an Honorary Professor in physics at Ludwig Maximilian University of Munich. She is also a chief co-coordinator of MaxSynBio, a research network of the Max Planck Society for synthetic biology.

Schwille developed the "two-photon cross-correlation spectroscopy" method with which fundamental cellular processes can be explored.

Schwille has been a member of the scientific Board of Trustees of the Heinrich Wieland Prize since 2011.

Awards and honors

Awards 
2001: Lecturer award by the German Chemical Industry Fund
2003: Young Investigator Award for Biotechnology of the Peter und Traudl Engelhorn Foundation
2004: Philip Morris Research Prize
 2010: Gottfried Wilhelm Leibniz Prize of the German Research Foundation (DFG)
 2011: Braunschweig Research Prize
2013: Suffrage Science Award, MRC-CSC, London
2018: Bavarian Maximilian Order for Science and Art
2021: Otto Warburg Medal

Memberships and fellowships 

 2005: Max-Planck-Fellow of the MPI for Molecular Cell Biology and Genetics
2010: Member of the German National Academy of Sciences Leopoldina
 2011: Member of the German Academy of Science and Engineering (acatech)
 2013: Member of the Berlin-Brandenburg Academy of Sciences and Humanities
2013: Member of EMBO
 2015: Honorary Fellow of the Royal Microscopical Society
 2017: Fellow of the Biophysical Society
2018: Member of the Academia Europaea

See also 
 Fluorescence cross-correlation spectroscopy
 Timeline of women in science

References

External links 
 
 
 

German biophysicists
Women biophysicists
Gottfried Wilhelm Leibniz Prize winners
People from Sindelfingen
1968 births
Living people
German women scientists
Members of the German Academy of Sciences Leopoldina
Max Planck Institute directors